The 1963–64 Mexican Segunda División was the 14th season of the Mexican Segunda División. The season started on 29 June 1963 and concluded on 7 February 1964. It was won by Cruz Azul. For the following season, the Primera División had an expansion from 14 to 16 teams, for which a promotion playoff was played at the end of this season.

Changes 
 Zacatepec was promoted to Primera División.
 Tampico was relegated from Primera División.
 Cataluña was renamed as C.F. Torreón.

Teams

League table

Results

Promotion Playoff 
In order to increase the number of team from 14 to 16 for the 1964-65 season the league made a playoff. The playoff was composed of the lowest team from Primera division and the 2nd-5th teams in the standings from Segunda Division as Cruz Azul had earned automatic promotion. The playoff was played between January 16 and February 6 1964. All games were played in Estadio Olímpico Universitario, Mexico City.

Tiebreaker match

References 

1963–64 in Mexican football
Segunda División de México seasons